Singletary may refer to:

People
Amos Singletary (1721–1806), American mill operator and lawyer, Representative of Massachusetts General Court
Clarence E. Singletary (1918-2015), American judge and politician
Daryle Singletary (1971–2018), American country music singer
Devin Singletary (born 1997), American football player
Mike Singletary (born 1958), former American football player, and former head coach of the San Francisco 49ers
Otis A. Singletary (1921–2003), historian and university administrator
Sean Singletary (born 1985), American professional basketball player
Tony Singletary, American television director

Places
Singletary Center for the Arts in Lexington, Kentucky
Singletary Lake in North Carolina
Singletary Lake State Park